The 2017–18 College of Charleston Cougars women's basketball team represents the College of Charleston during the 2017–18 NCAA Division I women's basketball season. The Cougars, led by fourth year head coach Candice M. Jackson, play their home games at the TD Arena and are members of the Colonial Athletic Association. They finished the season 7–24, 2–16 CAA play to finish in last place. They advanced to the quarterfinals of the CAA women's tournament where they lost to James Madison.

Previous season
They finished the season 9–21, 6–12 CAA play to finish in seventh place. They lost in the first round of the CAA women's tournament to UNC Wilmington.

Roster

Schedule

|-
!colspan=9 style=| Exhibition

|-
!colspan=9 style=| Non-conference regular season

|-
!colspan=9 style=| CAA regular season

|-
!colspan=9 style=| CAA Women's Tournament

See also
2017–18 College of Charleston Cougars men's basketball team

References

College of Charleston Cougars women's basketball seasons
College Of Charleston